Khatlon Bokhtar,(),  (is a professional football club based in Bokhtar, Tajikistan. They currently play in the top division of the country.

History
FC Vakhsh was founded in 1960. In Soviet times was the farm club of the core team of the Tajik SSR – Dushanbe based CSKA Pomir Dushanbe. From 1966 to 1984 the team played under the name of Pakhtakor. "Vakhsh" first became a champion of Tajikistan in 1961 and four years later the club won the Cup for the first time in Tajikistan.

Footballers from Qurghonteppa for the first time took part in the USSR Championship in 1966, playing in the Central Asian zone of B League, when finished 16th out of 19 teams. Although from the following season the team improved their performance, in 1967 17th place (among 22 teams), in 1968 10th (out of 22), 1969 – 6th (out of 24) and in 1970 5th place (out of 18). Unfortunately, the further advancement of the team was stopped due to reorganization of the Soviet football structure in 1971.

In 1978 Pakhtakor became champion of the Tajik SSR and won a ticket to the soviet second league. From 1978 to 1984 Pakhtakor played in the second league. Again, the team was just beginning to acquire confidence as a solution of the Sports Committee of the Soviet Union removed from the rally. Since 1986, Qurghonteppa was re-introduced in the second league. To defend the honor of the city took "Vakhsh – champion of the republic in 1985. This team also goes through the gradual conquest of positions. From 16th place in 1986, Vakhsh up to 4th place in 1989, after which the club has to play in the buffer zone, though not as a team, which finished in fourth place, but as the representative of Tajikistan. In those days, Vakhsh's best footballers always ended up in Tajikistan's best team, CSKA Pomir Dushanbe. The most notable of these are Mukhsin Mukhamadiev, Khakim Fuzailov, Rustam Zabirov, Sergei Mandreko, Alimzhon Rafikov, Alexander Asimov and Vladimir Dolganov.

Since 1992, Vakhsh plays in the Tajik League. In the same year "Vakhsh" took third place. The club has achieved great success in the 1997 season, having won Tajik Cup, and qualified for the first time to participate in AFC Cup Winners Cup. Also in 1997, the year Vakhsh became the champion of Tajikistan. Striker Rustam Usmanov scoring 21 goals was named the best scorer of the national championship. In 2002, Vakhsh played in the Tajik Cup final and in 2003 won the Tajik Cup. In 2004, Vakhsh took second place and was awarded the silver medals of the championship in Tajikistan. In 2005, Vakhsh once again reached the final of Tajik Cup, losing the deciding match Regar-TadAZ Tursunzoda in a penalty shootout. Although in the same year, Vakhsh became champions of Tajik League, a 17-year-old striker by the name of Akhtam Khamrakulov was named best scorer of the championship with 12 goals.

Vakhsh reached her peak of success in the international arena in 2006, when the team reached the final of AFC President's Cup losing to eventual champions Dordoi-Dynamo Naryn 2–1 in the extra time.

In February 2018, Vakhsh was taken over by the local government of Bokhtar (previously known as Qurghonteppa) due to financial difficulties, and was renamed FC Khatlon.

Domestic history

Continental history

Honours
SSR Tajik League (2): 1961, 1985
SSR Tajikistan Cup (1): 1965
Tajik League (3): 1997, 2005, 2009
Tajik Cup (2): 1997, 2003

Current squad
''

References

External links
  Vakhsh Fan Club
Vakhsh page on www.the-afc.com

Football clubs in Tajikistan
Association football clubs established in 1960
1960 establishments in Tajikistan